Shepherd Market is a small business-lined precinct featuring two small squares, one with a northern recess in Mayfair, in the West End of London, built up between 1735 and 1746 by Edward Shepherd on the open ground then used for the annual fair from which Mayfair derives; it does so with the east end of Shepherd Street which is also broad-pavemented. It is between Piccadilly and Curzon Street and has a village-like atmosphere. It was associated with upmarket prostitutes from its building up until at least the 1980s. In the 1920s, it hosted leading writers and artists such as Anthony Powell, Michael Arlen and Sophie Fedorovitch. Jeffrey Archer met Monica Coghlan here in the 1980s.

History 
The square was fully built up between 1735 and 1746 by Edward Shepherd from an open area called Brook Field, through which flowed the Tyburn, and where a May fair was held, from which the surrounding area of Mayfair derives its name.  A local architect, he was commissioned to develop the site and work was completed in the mid-18th century. It contained paved alleys, a duck pond, and a two-storey market topped by a theatre.

During the 1920s this was a rundown area, popular with writers and artists such as Michael Arlen and Sophie Fedorovitch. Arlen rented rooms opposite The Grapes public house and used the public place as the setting for his best-selling 1924 novel The Green Hat, which prompted Anthony Powell to move into the area in 1926.

It has been associated with upmarket prostitutes from its building up until at least the 1980s. When Olivia Manning and her husband Reggie Smith lived at 50a, she found the prostitutes "fascinating". In the 1980s, the then deputy Conservative Party chairman and author Jeffrey Archer allegedly met the prostitute Monica Coghlan in Shepherd Market.

Notable flats
Cass Elliot (Mama Cass) died at Flat 12, 9 Curzon Place (co-fronting Shepherd Market) on 28 July 1974. Keith Moon of The Who died at the same flat on 7 September 1978.

Geography
Shepherd Market is between Piccadilly and Curzon Street in Mayfair. The Curzon Mayfair Cinema stands at its eastern end, and the transition to residential street: Market Mews, where at right-angles crosses Hertford Street.

Notes and references 
Footnotes

Citations

External links 
 ShepherdMarket.co.uk

Squares in the City of Westminster
Retail markets in London
1735 establishments in England
Mayfair